Safiullah Rauf (born 1994) is an Afghan-American humanitarian and Navy reservist.  

Rauf was born in an Afghan refugee camp in Pakistan and immigrated to the United States as a teenager. Rauf became a hospital corpsman and linguist in the United States Navy. Rauf founded the Human First Coalition, which works to evacuate refugees from Afghanistan. In December 2021, while providing humanitarian aid in Kabul, Rauf was detained by the Taliban and held for 105 days; he was subsequently released in early April 2022, following negotiations between the Taliban and the Biden administration.

Personal life 
Safi Rauf was born in 1994 in an Afghan refugee camp in Pakistan. In his teenage years, Rauf immigrated to Omaha, Nebraska in the United States where he attended and later graduated from Millard South High School. In 2017, Rauf enlisted in the United States Navy Reserve and has served as a hospital corpsman. Rauf also served as a linguist and cultural advisor with Special Operations Forces in Afghanistan. In 2019, Rauf attended Georgetown University with a pre-med track. Following this, he was admitted to University of Nebraska Medical Center before deferring his acceptance to co-found the Human First Coalition.

Human First Coalition 
In 2021, Rauf co-founded the Human First Coalition alongside his brothers Zabih Rauf and Anees Khalil. Human First is an ad hoc organization designed to help aid those fleeing from Afghanistan following the United States' withdrawal from the country. The Human First Coalition is estimated to have rescued over 6,000 people from Afghanistan, including 1,000 Americans and their families, according to Rauf.

In 2022, Rauf advocated for the Afghan Adjustment Act, a bill that aims to help Afghan Afghan evacuees become legal permanent U.S. residents.

Taliban captivity 
In November 2021, following approval from the Taliban and United States government, Safi Rauf and his brother Anees Khalil began humanitarian work in Kabul, helping evacuate Afghans from the country.

On December 18, senior officials from Taliban's General Directorate of Intelligence approached the brothers and requested they provide an interview, claiming that all foreigners were required to provide such. Following this interview, Safi, Anees, and three British nationals were taken captive on suspicion of espionage and were placed "in rooms that were 8 feet by 8 feet, with no phones, blankets, mattresses or sunlight." The brothers stated that during their captivity, both were tortured by their captors; both brothers attempted a hunger strike in a bid to be released. In mid-March, both captees' families were permitted 15 minutes by the Taliban to speak with Safi and Anees.

The American State Department and Biden administration conducted a months-long negotiation effort to secure the release of both brothers. On March 31, the brothers were informed they were going to be released and told their captivity was "a misunderstanding". In total, both were held captive for 105 days and were released into U.S. custody on April 1, 2022. The brothers were flown to a U.S. military base in Qatar before returning to the United States.

See also 
 Foreign hostages in Afghanistan
 Mark Frerichs

External links 

 Ted Talk

References 

1994 births
Living people
Afghan emigrants to the United States
American humanitarians